Made for Love is a 1926 American silent drama film directed by Paul Sloane, produced by Cecil B. DeMille, and starring Leatrice Joy.

Plot
As described in a film magazine review, Nicholas Ainsworth is a young American archaeologist working in Egypt who neglects his wife Joan for his work, in which he is assisted by Lady Diana Trent, a titled Englishwoman. His wife resents her husband’s attitude and, after a number of adventures, accepts the attentions of a native prince. For revenge of what he considers to be an affront to his family, the prince plots to dynamite a tomb while the scientist is working in it. The neglected wife rides to warn her husband of the  danger. Both are trapped by the explosion. The prince is killed by a falling rock, and the scientist and his wife are finally rescued and reconciled.

Cast

Production
In the first reel, the introduction of Joan (Leatrice Joy) is accompanied by a closeup with her new hair style. Joy had impulsively cut her hair short in 1926, and DeMille, whom Joy had followed when he set up Producers Distributing Corporation, was publicly angry as it prevented her from portraying traditional feminine roles. The studio developed projects with roles suitable for her “Leatrice Joy bob”, and Made for Love was the first of five films before she regrew her hair. Despite this, a professional dispute would end the Joy / Demille partnership in 1928.

Preservation
A copy of Made for Love is preserved film at the UCLA Film and Television Archive.

References

External links

Stills at moviessilently.com
Still at silentfilmstillarchive.com
Still at silenthollywood.com

1926 films
American silent feature films
Films based on short fiction
1926 drama films
American black-and-white films
Producers Distributing Corporation films
Silent American drama films
Films directed by Paul Sloane
Films with screenplays by Garrett Fort
1920s American films